Moulana Tayyeb Saheb is the Imam or current spiritual head of the Atba-e-Malak Vakil group of Mustaali Ismaili Shi'a Islam.

References 

Tayyibi Isma'ilism
Musta'li imams